Dovid Grossman (1946 – 5 February 2018) was a well-known Talmudic lecturer and Talmid Chochom who disseminated Torah worldwide.

Biography
Rabbi Tuvia Goldstein, his 12th grade rebbi (teacher) in Rabbi Jacob Joseph School, encouraged Grossman to enroll in the Talmudical Yeshiva of Philadelphia after high school. Grossman studied under Rabbi Elya Svei and Rabbi Shmuel Kamenetsky. While en route to Israel, he also learned one Elul zman in a branch of the Novardok yeshiva in France.

In Israel, he joined Yeshiva Mir in Jerusalem, where he became a student of its Rosh Yeshiva, Rabbi Chaim Shmuelevitz. In Jerusalem, Grossman developed a personal relationship with Rabbi Meir Soloveichik, a son of Rabbi Yitzchak Zev Soloveitchik.

After returning to the United States, Grossman learned in the Lakewood Kollel. After 7 years there, he became one of the founding members of the Lakewood Kollel branch in Los Angeles. In 1981, he helped start Yeshiva Gedolah of Los Angeles (YGLA), where he served as the 12th grade Talmud lecturer until 2008. Concurrently with position as lecturer at YGLA, he opened a Torah program called Yeshivas HaChaim for working young adults and college students, independent of the Yeshiva.

Grossman was known for his Talmud lectures. Recordings of his lectures on every page of the Talmud (Daf Yomi) are available and widely used. Those lectures were repackaged and sold in a digital format as a customized iPod dubbed the Shaspod.

Personal life
Grossman married his wife, Rachel, principal of Valley Torah High School's girls division in Valley Village, California.

Grossman died following a motor vehicle accident on the morning of February 5, 2018, on the West Shore Expressway in Staten Island, New York, shortly after 4 a.m.

References

External links to some of his many thousand lectures
 
Rabbi Grossman on TorahDownloads.com
 
Rabbi Grossman on englishtorahtapes.com
 Rabbi Grossman on Torah Media
 Rabbi Grossman on dafyomi.org
 Yeshiva Gedolah of Los Angeles

1946 births
2018 deaths
People from Borough Park, Brooklyn
American Haredi rabbis
Beth Medrash Govoha alumni
Road incident deaths in New York City
21st-century American Jews